Daniel Namaso Edi-Mesumbe Loader (born 28 August 2000) is an English professional footballer who plays as a forward for Portuguese side Porto.

Club career
Loader was born in Reading, Berkshire, and started his career in the youth team of Wycombe Wanderers before joining the under-13 side at his hometown club Reading in 2012. He studied at Leighton Park School and then The Forest School. In 2016 he won the Maurice Edelston Memorial Trophy for the best academy schoolboy at the club. In the summer of 2016 he started a two-year scholarship, but was quickly promoted to the under-23 side after a number of games and went on to represent the side in the EFL Trophy campaign. He made his professional debut for the first team at the age of sixteen in August 2017, coming on as a substitute for Leandro Bacuna in extra time in the 3–1 victory over Millwall in the EFL Cup. In the process he became only the third Reading player to make his debut under the age of seventeen. At the end of the month he signed his first professional contract when he turned seventeen. Prolific for the youth team, he was given a chance in the first team under José Gomes and became the youngest Reading player to reach 20 appearances. On 27 April, he scored his first senior goal against Middlesbrough.
Loader was close to a move to Wolverhampton Wanderers before Wolves pulled out of the move due to Reading upping the price at the last moment. A few days later he scored the winning penalty in round 2 of the EFL Cup against Wycombe Wanderers.

FC Porto
On 20 August 2020, FC Porto announced the signing of Loader for Porto B, on a two-year contract. He made 32 appearances for the reserve team in his first season, finishing with 8 goals, the highest tally on the team. Loader began the following season with Porto B and went on to score 15 goals. He was named in the senior squad for the first time for a league match against Boavista on 30 October. He came off the bench late in the match to replace centre-forward Evanilson, and he scored in added time, sealing a 4–1 win.

Loader started the 2022–23 season by winning the Supertaça Cândido de Oliveira after being handed a surprising first start for Porto in a game that they ran out 3-0 winners over Tondela.

International career
Loader is eligible to represent England and Cameroon. He has represented England at under-16, under-17, under-18, under-19 level and under-20. He was a member of the England U-17 team that finished runners-up to Spain in the 2017 UEFA European Under-17 Championship held in May in Croatia, making a total of five appearances in the tournament. 

In September 2017, Loader was called up to England U17 team for the 2017 FIFA U17 World Cup. Loader scored twice in a group stage game against Iraq and came off the bench in the quarter-final against the United States. He did not feature in the final as England defeated Spain to lift the trophy.

In September 2018, Loader scored twice for the England U19 team against the Netherlands.

On 28 May 2019, Loader was called up to the England U20 for the 2019 Toulon Tournament. He scored his first goal for the U20 age group on his ninth appearance; a 3–0 win over Iceland U21s at Wycombe on 19 November 2019.

Personal life
His brother, Ben Loader, is a professional rugby player with London Irish.

Career statistics

Honours
Porto
Primeira Liga: 2021–22
Supertaça Cândido de Oliveira: 2022
Taça da Liga: 2022-23

England U17
FIFA U-17 World Cup: 2017
UEFA European Under-17 Championship runner-up: 2017

References

External links
Profile at the FC Porto website

England profile at The Football Association

2000 births
Living people
Association football forwards
Black British sportspeople
English footballers
English people of Cameroonian descent
England youth international footballers
Reading F.C. players
Sportspeople from Reading, Berkshire
Footballers from Berkshire
English expatriate footballers
Liga Portugal 2 players
FC Porto B players
English expatriate sportspeople in Portugal
Expatriate footballers in Portugal